Coin Master is a free, single-player, casual mobile game created by Israeli studio Moon Active. It has had over 100 million downloads (as of February 2021). Coin Master is the top-grossing mobile game in the UK (since February 2019) and Germany (since June 2019).

Gameplay
The objective of Coin Master is to win coins to upgrade items in order to build up villages.

Coin Master can be found under the 'Adventure Game' category in the app stores, but uses gambling mechanics. In order to build their own game villages or attack the villages of other players, users must spin to win coins. The number of attempts is limited to seven per hour, but additional attempts and items can be purchased in spins. Also, free spins are gifted by Coin Master through links on their social channels and by subscribing to their email newsletter. There are also numerous websites and third-party applications that collect these links to make it easy for players to collect all the free gift rewards.

Strategy 
A fortune is acquired by spinning and winning, attacking another player's village, or raiding another player’s fortune. A maximum of five shields, as well as the pet Rhino, can be used to defend villages. When a player's village is attacked, the game also allows "revenge" so a player can launch a counterattack.

Level 
Players advance to the next village once theirs is built. The levels continuously get more challenging as the player progresses. As of December 2022, Coin Master has 472 levels.

Villages 
Players continue to spin, win and build through close to 500 uniquely themed village adventures, such as LA dreams, Buddhist village, Hell's village, and so on. Other village themes include Magical Forest, Steampunk Land, and Coin Manor. Villages have five items, which can include characters, pets, homes, transportation, and items from nature. To complete a village the player needs coins. Every next village is more expensive than the one before.To move on to the next village, players have to finish building five elements in the village they are currently in. The elements they need to build may differ depending on the theme and style of each village.

Card collection 
The Queen's Throne card may be found on the Brazil Set's town number 167. This is an uncommon card that may be exchanged out for a Joker during gold trade events or won on Viking 10.

An extremely popular feature in the game is the ‘Card Collection’. Players make tremendous efforts to collect and trade cards in hopes of completing card sets, which are used to win sought-after rewards such as spins, pet experience, and more. Chests with collectible cards inside them can also be collected using coins.

Cards differ in value, and some of the rarest ones can be very difficult to find. The most precious cards can be shown off to the player's communities.

There are countless unofficial online social groups of fans from all over the world that are dedicated purely to card trading. Most of the groups can be found on Facebook.

Characters 
The pig that is placed in all the events and promotion art of the game is the protagonist (tour guide) of Coin Master.

Additionally, there are new characters introduced in every village.

The game also features other mythological characters such as wizards, witches, warriors, and queens.

Pets 
Foxy, Tiger, and Rhino are the 3 pets that are designed to help players collect more coins each in their own unique way. Pets can be raised by obtaining treats for them and raising their XP (experience points) by using XP potions. Foxy gives the player extra coins for a raid up to 107% of player's raid value. Tiger gives the player extra coins for attacks. These extra coins can get up to 410% of the attack value. Rhino protects player's village from attacks. This pet protects up to 70% of the attacks on their village. Additionally, pets need to be kept awake with treats. For each treat they stay awake for 4 hours. They can stay awake for longer periods of time with multiple treats.

Gifts 
Players can gift each friend one Spin every 48 hours, and they can do the same for one. As long as the Spin bar is empty, they can collect up to 100 Spins every day. Gifting Spins to friends won’t decrease the players own inventory, but to collect 100 spins, one needs to have active 100 friends on Facebook.

Coins 
Coins are being used to repair and build the players village in order to reach the next level. They can earn coins through rewards, raiding other villages, using the slot machine and through events.

Spins 
Spins are required to advance in Coin Master. Because the slot machine runs because of the spins and the players get the gifts. Free spins are provided daily by the official game. Along with this, these spins are also made available through some social media groups and websites.

Chests 
Chests are items in the game that contain collectible cards. They come in three different tiers - Wooden, Golden, and Magical.

In chests, players will find different items such as cards, which they can collect. If they complete a card collection they will receive rewards. They can also trade these cards with friends. There are three different tiers of chests; wooden, golden, and magical.

The different chests contain a different number of cards:

Wooden chests: 2 cards

Golden chests: 4 cards

Magical chests: 8 cards

Players can get these chests in different ways. During raids, they can dig them out, but they can also get them as a reward for finishing villages and reaching the next level. It is also possible to buy the chests in the shop of the game using coins.

Viking quest 

Coin Master is a popular mobile game that features various in-game events and quests, including the Viking Quest. The Viking Quest is a special event in the game that allows players to travel through various Viking-themed islands and complete challenges to earn rewards.

During the Viking Quest event, players must collect items such as Hammers, Shields, and Piggy Banks to progress through each island. These items can be obtained by spinning the slot machine in the game, and players must collect a certain number of each item to unlock the next island.

Each island in the Viking Quest event features a unique set of challenges that must be completed to earn rewards such as Coins, Spins, and rare game cards. Some of the challenges include defeating enemy Viking characters, raiding Viking villages, and finding hidden treasure.

Players can also earn bonus rewards by completing daily challenges during the Viking Quest event, which can include tasks such as spinning a certain number of times or raiding a certain number of villages.

VIP Status 
VIP is a special status that gives extra benefits to players like extra spins, coins, exclusive events, a private Facebook group, and a permanent player ID. It was rumored that the VIP is given to players who spend a specific amount of money in the game depending on the country they play from but people have accused Moonactive of not being transparent enough with the process.

Commercial 
Coin Master surpassed Candy Crush Saga as a top-grossing game and claimed first place on both the App Store and Google Play store in the United Kingdom and Ireland.

According to the website OMR, Moon Active earned  until October 2019.

In his late night show on German public TV, Jan Böhmermann voiced his opinion that Coin Master is marketed to children and adolescents despite corresponding denials, among other things such as the child-friendly look of the game and advertising from popular influencers like Pietro Lombardi.

Investors 
The company has investors from the tech industry, such as Gigi Levy-Weiss, the former CEO of the Gibraltar based online casino company 888 Holdings.

Advertisements 
Jennifer Lopez, Khloé Kardashian, Eugenio Derbez, Kris Jenner, and Scott Disick have featured in advertisements for Coin Master. Other celebrities who have participated in advertisements for the game are Ben Higgins, Chris Harrison, Rae Sremmurd, Terry Crews, Emily Ratajkowski, Cardi B, Joan Collins, David Schwimmer, Dieter Bohlen, the Spice Girls and Chayanne.

Awards 
Coin Master was ranked in the top 20 of the acclaimed Top 50 Developers/Top 50 Mobile Game Makers list from PocketGamer.biz, published October 1, 2019. The game has also received countless mentions in industry publications regarding its continuous stance of 1st place in the weekly/monthly roundup lists of Top Grossing games on both the App Store and Google Play in 2019.

Use in scamming 
Coin Master has been used as part of "human verification" scams. As part of the scam, a malicious website prompts the user to "prove they are not a robot" by playing other games or installing applications, with the end goal of receiving in-game currencies.

References

External links
 Coin Master at MoonActive

Active massively multiplayer online games
Social casual games
Free online games
Free-to-play video games
IOS games
Android (operating system) games
Windows games
Windows Phone games
MacOS games
Massively multiplayer online role-playing games
Video games developed in Israel
2016 video games